New Woodville is an unincorporated community in Marshall County, Oklahoma, United States. The population was 132 at the 2010 census. Proposals to annex the unincorporated areas of New Woodville and McBride on the shores of Lake Texoma were considered in the past. Listed erroneously by the Census Bureau as "Woodville" from 2000 to 1980, the town's name was corrected in Census Bureau listings in 2005.

Geography
New Woodville is located at  (33.968724, -96.654078).

Armstrong Road, Durham Street, and Lee Ann Drive are north of the BNSF which do not have a bypass because they do not connect to any other streets.

Demographics

As of the census of 2000, there were 69 people, 27 households, and 18 families residing in the town. The population density was 605.8 people per square mile (242.2/km2). There were 37 housing units at an average density of 324.9 per square mile (129.9/km2). The racial makeup of the town was 98.55% White and 1.45% Native American. Hispanic or Latino of any race were 2.90% of the population.

There were 27 households, out of which 37.0% had children under the age of 18 living with them, 44.4% were married couples living together, 18.5% had a female householder with no husband present, and 33.3% were non-families. 33.3% of all households were made up of individuals, and 11.1% had someone living alone who was 65 years of age or older. The average household size was 2.56 and the average family size was 3.00.

In the town, the population was spread out, with 34.8% under the age of 18, 2.9% from 18 to 24, 33.3% from 25 to 44, 21.7% from 45 to 64, and 7.2% who were 65 years of age or older. The median age was 31 years. For every 100 females, there were 86.5 males. For every 100 females age 18 and over, there were 125.0 males.

The median income for a household in the town was $9,375, and the median income for a family was $9,375. Males had a median income of $15,625 versus $18,750 for females. The per capita income for the town was $5,438. There were 52.9% of families and 47.5% of the population living below the poverty line, including 36.8% are under age 18 and 57.1% of those over age 64.

History
An earlier Oklahoma community named Woodville was submerged in 1944 when the Red River was dammed (Denison Dam) to create Lake Texoma.
The drought of 2013 reduced the level of Lake Texoma sufficiently to expose some of Old Woodville's foundations and storm cellars.

The original Woodville town incorporated between 1900 and 1907 and disincorporated when inundated in 1944. The community reincorporated as New Woodville town about two miles north of the original townsite also in 1944. New Woodville disincorporated for brief periods in the late 90s or the early 2000s, but has legally existed since 2002 although the town government has been inactive.

References

Unincorporated communities in Marshall County, Oklahoma
Unincorporated communities in Oklahoma
Former municipalities in Oklahoma